Alpraham is a civil parish in Cheshire East, England. It contains twelve buildings that are recorded in the National Heritage List for England as designated listed buildings. Of these, one is listed at Grade II*, the second-highest grade, and the others are at Grade II.  Apart from the village of Alpraham, the parish is rural, and most of the listed buildings are residential or related to farming.  The Shropshire Union Canal runs through the villages, and five structures associated with this are listed, two bridges, a set of locks, a stable block, and a former lock-keeper's cottage.

Key

Buildings

See also
Listed buildings in Calveley
Listed buildings in Bunbury
Listed buildings in Rushton
Listed buildings in Tiverton
Listed buildings in Tilstone Fearnall

References
Citations

Sources

Listed buildings in the Borough of Cheshire East
Lists of listed buildings in Cheshire